Gadalla Gubara (1920–2008) was a Sudanese cameraman, film producer, director and photographer. Over five decades, he produced more than 50 documentaries and three feature films. He was a pioneer of African cinema, having been a co-founder of both the Pan-African Federation of Filmmakers FEPACI and the FESPACO Film festival (Ouagadougou, Burkina Faso). His daughter, Sara Gubara, who is a graduate of Cairo Higher Institute of Cinema, Egypt, assisted him with his later film projects, after he had lost his eyesight. She is considered to be Sudan's first female film director.

Early life
Gubara was born in Khartoum, Sudan in 1920. His father was a farmer, and a part of the extended family of Muhammad Ahmad. During World War II, he served as an officer in the Royal Corps of Signals on the North African campaign. There, the Colonial Film Unit screened films such as Desert Victory, Our African Soldiers on Active Service and With Our African Troops in the Middle East for the troops. This was Gubara's first exposure to film, leading him to seek further training after the war, while stationed in London and Cyprus.

After his training, the British Film Unit commissioned him to return to Sudan and make educational films about the country's agriculture schemes to be screened to local audiences across the country.

Career

Gubara was also one of Sudan's first photographers, capturing for example the raising of the flag of the newly independent country on January 1, 1956. In a late recognition, some of his photographs were presented in 2015 at the retrospective exhibition 'The Khartoum School: the making of the modern art movement in Sudan (1945–present)''' by the Sharjah Art Foundation, UAE.

In 1955, Gubara produced Africa's first colour film, Song of Khartoum, a contribution to the genre of documentary films about avant-garde cities. The years following independence in 1956 were marked by an atmosphere of political and cultural awakening in Sudan. Gubara became the main filmmaker for the newly established Sudan Film Unit under the Ministry of Culture and Information. During this period, he documented many events and everyday life with his camera: Government meetings with president Gamal Abdel Nasser of Egypt or Ethiopian emperor Haile Selassi on a state visit, the nightlife of Khartoum, the construction of railway lines, factories and dams. At the end of the 1950s, he received a grant to continue his film studies at the University of Southern California, and was appointed as director of the Sudan Film Unit upon his return in 1962.

Wanting to produce his own documentaries and, most of all, feature films, he left the Sudan Film Unit and set up Sudan's first private film studio, Studio Gad, in 1974. His first feature film Tajouj (1977) is a dramatic story about the unhappy love of two suitors towards the heroine, set in rural Eastern Sudan, and featured the actor Salah ibn Al Badya. Tajouj won the Nefertiti Statue, Egypt's highest film award, at the Cairo International Film Festival in 1982, and won prizes at film festivals in Alexandria, Ouagadougou, Tehran, Addis Ababa, Berlin, Moscow, Cannes and Carthage.

In 1984, Gubara published a semi-documentary short film called 'Viva Sara'. It tells the story of his daughter Sara, who despite her physical handicap from having suffered from polio as a child, became Sudan's first participant in an international competition for swimmers between the island of Capri and the city of Naples in Italy.

Gadalla lost his sight at the age of 80, when his studio had been confiscated by the government, but still continued with his last film projects, with his daughter Sara Gadalla Gubara assisting him. In 2006, he received the 'Award for Excellence' for his career at the Africa Movie Academy Awards. 

 Reception 
Highlighting perhaps Gubara's most prolific era, the Sudanese author Omar Zaki wrote: 

In 2008, filmmaker Frédérique Cifuentes made a documentary film about Gubara, called Cinema in Sudan: Conversations with Gadalla Gubara, part of which was made available in Sudan Memory's online archive.

 Filmography (feature films)Tajouj (1977)Barakat Al-Sheikh (1998)Les misérables'', adaptation of the novel by Victor Hugo (2006)

See also 

 Cinema of Sudan
 Photography of Sudan

References

External links 
Cinema in Sudan: Conversations with Gadalla Gubara (Documentary about his life and work)
TED talk by Sara Gubara about her life and collaboration with her father (In Arabic with English subtitles)

Studio Gad - Information and short documentary films by Gubara, from Khartoum in the 1970s
Video report on Gubara's last feature film Les miserables, starting from 8:00 in part 2 of the video 
Short video, with Gubara talking about his life and work
Photographs by Gubara from the archives of elnour.org

1920 births
2008 deaths
People from Khartoum
Sudanese documentary film directors
Sudanese photographers
British Army personnel of World War II
Royal Corps of Signals officers
Sudanese film producers
Sudanese film directors